John Cobb Lauderdale (September 20, 1872 - June 4, 1951) was an American teacher, farmer, and Democratic politician. He was a member of the Mississippi legislature in the early-to-mid 20th century.

Biography 
John Cobb Lauderdale was born in Lewisburg, Mississippi, on September 20, 1872. He was the son of Eli Benton Lauderdale and Leonora (Cobb) Lauderdale. He was educated in the schools of DeSoto County, Mississippi. He became a teacher and a farmer. He was elected to represent DeSoto County as a Democrat in the Mississippi House of Representatives in 1915 and served from 1916 to 1920. He represented Mississippi's 35th senatorial district in the Mississippi Senate from 1940 to 1944. Lauderdale died on June 4, 1951, at his home in Hernando, Mississippi.

References 

1872 births
1951 deaths
People from DeSoto County, Mississippi
Democratic Party members of the Mississippi House of Representatives
Democratic Party Mississippi state senators